45/85 is an ABC News television documentary. It aired on September 18, 1985. The three-hour program combined archive film and television footage with new interviews to document post-World War II history, focusing especially on the Cold War. That special was produced by Av Westin, who also produced Our World.

Ted Koppel and Peter Jennings were the co-anchors. The executive producer of the broadcast was Av Westin and it was written by Koppel, Jennings and senior producer Pete Simmons. 45/85 featured interviews with then President Ronald Reagan, as well as interviews with every living former President, Jimmy Carter, Gerald Ford and Richard Nixon.  In a stylistic innovation, 45/85 confined itself in its other interviews to people who were eyewitnesses and participants of the events they described, rather than historians or "experts."

The success of 45/85 led ABC to create the documentary series Our World in 1986. Our World, with a similar format blending archive footage and eyewitness interviews, was critically acclaimed but low-rated and ABC canceled it after a single season.

References

External links
 45/85 at the Internet Movie Database

American Broadcasting Company original programming
1985 American television series debuts
1980s American documentary television series
ABC News